The Widikum people are an ethnic group of Cameroon and are one of the largest ethnic groups of the North-West Region of Cameroon .

Origins 
  
According to oral tradition, the Widikum people originated from an area near the villages of Bamben and Numben in the Northwest region of Cameroon. Egun Oyimi is said to be the ancestral home of the Widikum-speaking people found in Momo division, parts of Mezam, Lebialem, Manyu, Menchum, Menoua, and Bamboutus divisions. 
Residing in the  Momo Division, around Widikum, Fon Gorji Dinka,  Ambazonian activist and lawyer,  is one of the tribal leaders.

Language 

The Widikum people mainly speak the Meta’ language, which is broken up into 2 main dialects: Menemo (Mbengwi), and  Moghamo
(Batibo), These dialects have slight differences, but generally sound the same and mutually intelligible.

Culture 

The Widikum people have a very vibrant and colorful culture, which includes traditional clothing, dances, and cuisines.

Widikums, along with the most of the North West Region, wear what is commonly called “Bamenda Dress/Clothes.” However, each tribe has a particular design and pattern belonging to them.

Widikums have over a dozen of traditional dances, which include the Kwem Sword Dance, Tewara Dance, Mukonge Dance, and one of the most popular, the Chibi Dance. Each of the dances has their own meanings and may be dances at different occasions. For example, one certain dance could be performed at a funeral, while another could be performed at a wedding.

Demographics 

Widikum people are primarily found in the Momo Department (Division) of the North West Region of Cameroon. Momo is then made up of 5 LGAs which are:

•Batibo

•Mbengwi

•Ngie

•Widikum

•Njikwa

Momo is populated with over 250,000+ inhabitants.

References

Sources 

 
 
 
 
 

 
Ethnic groups in Cameroon
Northwest Region (Cameroon)